The Paroșeni Power Station is a large electricity producer and one of the largest thermal power plants in Romania having 4 groups, 3 of 50 MW and one of 150 MW thus totalling an installed capacity of 300 MW.

The power plant is situated in the Hunedoara County (central-western Romania), on the banks of the Jiu River.

See also

 List of power stations in Romania

External links
 Description 

Coal-fired power stations in Romania